was a Japanese special forces/airborne unit during World War II. The unit was a division-level force, and was part of the Imperial Japanese Army Air Force (IJAAF). The Teishin units were therefore distinct from the marine parachute units of the Special Naval Landing Forces.

History

The Imperial Japanese Army developed an airborne paratroop force in the late 1930s, but the program did not receive much attention by the Imperial General Headquarters until review of the success of similar German paratroop units during the Blitzkrieg of 1940.

Army paratroops were first deployed in combat during the Battle of Palembang, on Sumatra in the Netherlands East Indies (now Indonesia) on 14 February 1942. The operation was well-planned, with 425 men of the 1st Parachute Raiding Regiment seizing Palembang airfield, while the paratroopers of the 2nd Parachute Raiding Regiment seized the town and its important oil refinery. However, after the 1st Raiding Regiment departed Japan aboard the transport ship, Meiko Maru bound for Indochina, it suddenly caught fire in the South China Sea sinking near Hainan Island January 3, 1942. All the paratroopers were rescued by the Japanese cruiser Kashii but lost all their equipment and were exhausted and therefore did not partake leaving the operation to the 2nd Parachute Raiding Regiment. The IJA paratroopers were subsequently deployed in the Burma campaign only to have the operation aborted.

Following this success, in July 1943, the 1st Glider Tank Troop was formed, with four Type 95 Ha-Go light tanks. This unit was eventually expanded to battalion size, with a tank company using 14 Type 2 Ke-To light tanks, an infantry company, and a motorized transport company.

The paratroop brigades were organized into the Teishin Shudan as the first division-level raiding unit, at the main Japanese airborne base, Karasehara Airfield, Kyūshū, Japan. It was commanded by a major general, and was organized as follows:

 headquarters company (220 personnel)
 aviation brigade
 raiding brigade
 two glider infantry regiments
 raiding artillery company (120 personnel)
 raiding signals company (140 personnel)
 raiding engineer company (250 personnel)

The unit had an estimated 5,575 personnel.

However, as with similar airborne units created by the Allies and other Axis powers, the Japanese paratroops suffered from a disproportionately high casualty rate, and the loss of men who required such extensive and expensive training limited their operations to only the most critical ones. For the most part, the Teishin Shudan was deployed as elite light infantry.

Two regiments of Teishin Shudan were formed into the 1st Raiding Group, commanded by Major General Rikichi Tsukada under the control of the Southern Expeditionary Army Group, during the Philippines campaign. Although structured as a division, its capabilities were much lower, as its six regiments had manpower equivalent to a standard infantry battalion, and it lacked any form of artillery, and had to rely on other units for logistical support. Its men were no longer parachute-trained, but relied on aircraft for transport.

Philippines Campaign 

Some 750 men, mainly from the 2nd Raiding Brigade, of this group were assigned to attack American air bases on Luzon and Leyte on the night of 6 December 1944. They were flown in Ki-57 transports, but most of the aircraft were shot down. Some 300 commandos managed to land in the Burauen area on Leyte. The force destroyed some planes and inflicted numerous casualties before they were annihilated.

The remainder of Teishin Shudan remained based in the Philippines until the end of the war.

Equipment used by Teishin units

Army Paratrooper Uniform

The uniforms of Japanese Army paratroops during the Palembang Campaign in first stages of the war was similar to that of German Luftwaffe paratroops. The padded leather helmet was later replaced by a steel one, although photographs suggest that the German helmet was actually issued to Japanese parachute troops. The troops wore standard infantry equipment with additional ammunition bandoleers. In the Philippines campaigns later in the war, the uniforms were changed to the standard Army Khaki colour uniform with brown belts and harness, the yellow star in the cap and kepi plus dark or light brown boots and gloves.

In both cases Japanese Army paratroopers wore badges depicting a golden kite, similar to pilot wings, as well as a roundel emblem depicting an opened parachute and star.

Weapons
Bayonet (Type 30 bayonet)
Type 26 revolver
Type 14 pistol
Type 94 pistol
Arisaka rifle
Type 2 rifle
Type 100 submachine gun
Type 96 light machine gun
Type 99 light machine gun
Type 97 20 mm anti-tank rifle
Type 97 grenade
Type 89 grenade discharger
Type 97 grenade discharger
Type 11 70 mm infantry mortar
Type 99 81 mm mortar
Type 11 37 mm infantry gun

Some heavy weapons were dropped in special parachute containers.

In the later stages of the war, it was planned that the Teishin units be equipped with some advanced weapons, including experimental anti-tank weapons like the Type 4 70 mm AT Rocket Launcher and Type 5 45mm recoilless gun, but this never occurred.

Armoured support was to be provided by Type 95 Ha-Go light tank among other types. It was also intended that the Teishin units use the Special No. 3 Flying Tank So-Ra or Ku-Ro, amongst the Maeda Ku-6 Flying Tank an experimental winged tank which never went into production.

See also
Giretsu Kuteitai
Japanese marine paratroopers of World War II
Fallschirmjäger (World War II)
Paratrooper
Airborne forces
List of paratrooper forces
Commando

References

 Jowett, Philip. The Japanese Army 1931-1945, Volume 2. Osprey. 2002 
Rottman, Gordon. Japanese Paratroop Forces of World War II (Elite), Osprey 2005 
Japanese Parachute Troops by United States War Department 
MILITARY INTELLIGENCE SERVICE SPECIAL SERIES No. 32, Japanese Parachute Troops

Japanese World War II special forces
Airborne units and formations
Infantry units and formations
Military history of Japan during World War II
Units and formations of the Imperial Japanese Army Air Service
Military units and formations established in 1941
Military units and formations disestablished in 1945
1941 establishments in Japan
1945 disestablishments in Japan
Air Divisions of Japan